William Francis Asbury Buchanan (July 2, 1876 – July 12, 1954) was a Canadian journalist, newspaper publisher and politician from Alberta.

Early life
William Francis Asbury Buchanan was born on July 2, 1876 at South Monaghan, Northumberland and Durham County, Ontario, one of seven children to Reverend William Buchanan and Mary Rebecca Pendrie Buchanan. He was given two middle names derived from Rev. Francis Asbury, the first bishop of the Methodist Episcopal Church to be consecrated in America. Buchanan took an early interest in journalism, with his first article published by Brighton's Weekly Ensign at the age of thirteen.

Buchanan began his career in journalism in 1893 working for The Peterborough Examiner which he was affiliated with for a three year period, he also worked on the editorial staff for The Peterboro Review until 1898. He later was employed as the city editor of the Toronto Telegram until 1903. He served as secretary of the Ontario Hockey Association prior to 1903, when succeeded by W. A. Hewitt.

Buchanan was the managing director of the journal in St. Thomas from 1903 until 1905. He left Ontario in 1905 and moved west to Alberta and purchased the Lethbridge Weekly Herald. He attempted, unsuccessfully, to turn the paper into a daily in 1907 but it soon resumed a weekly publishing schedule. Buchanan was also be named the first librarian of the Alberta Legislature in 1906.

Buchanan married Alma Maude Freeman in 1904 and had two children together, Donald and Hugh.

Political life
Buchanan entered provincial politics when he contested the riding of Lethbridge City on behalf of the Alberta Liberal Party in the 1909 provincial election and won a seat in the 2nd Alberta Legislature. Buchanan defeated his Conservative opponent William Carlos Ives by 73 votes, and Labor opponent Donald McNabb by 315 votes. Buchanan had previously served as the president of the Lethbridge Liberal Association prior to his decision to run provincially. Buchanan was appointed Minister without portfolio in Alexander Cameron Rutherford's government after the election, however he resigned his Cabinet position on March 8, 1910 over a disagreement with provincial railway policy resulting from the Alberta and Great Waterways Railway scandal, and later resigned his seat in the Legislature on September 20, 1911.

Buchanan switched to federal politics in the 1911 federal election. Buchanan was a strong believer in reciprocity, a policy of increasing trade with the United States led by Liberal Prime Minister Wilfrid Laurier. On August 10, 1911, Buchanan was the unanimous choice at the Medicine Hat Liberal convention as the candidate in the upcoming election. Buchanan was subsequently successful, and was elected for the seat of Medicine Hat as a federal Liberal defeating Conservative incumbent Charles Alexander Magrath by 1,355 votes. Despite Buchanan's success in Medicine Hat, the Liberal Party lost 48 seats and control of Parliament, and new Conservative government led by Robert Borden took charge.

As a result of the Conscription Crisis of 1917, Buchanan crossed the floor to support the government of Sir Robert Borden. He was re-elected to the House of Commons of Canada as a Unionist for the new riding of Lethbridge in the 1917 general election defeating Laurier Liberals opponent Lambert "L" Pack. In 1918, Buchanan was part of a group of Canadian journalists brought over-seas to see the battlefields and military installations of the First World War as guests of Lord Beaverbrook, the head of the British wartime Ministry of Information. He wrote several installments published in the Lethbridge Herald about what he witnessed during the trip.

Buchanan weighed his options ahead of the 1921 election, deciding whether he would contest the riding for the Liberal party. Mackenzie King pushed Buchanan to stand for election, and Buchanan privately consented to run as an Independent Liberal, however Buchanan later changed his mind and chose not to run. He announced his decision on the first page of the Lethbridge Herald on October 24, 1921.

Buchanan was called to the Senate of Canada at the age of 49 on September 5, 1925 on the advice of Prime Minister William Lyon Mackenzie King, and served until his death in 1954 as a member of the Liberal Party of Canada. Buchanan was a passionate supporter of Waterton Lakes National Park while in the Senate, calling for a fish hatchery, expansion of the Park into British Columbia, championing the International Peace Park status which was realized in 1932 as Waterton-Glacier International Peace Park. In the Senate he was referred to as "the Senator from Waterton Lakes National Park".

Later life and legacy
In 1944, Buchanan was elected president of The Canadian Press. Buchanan continued as owner of the Lethbridge Herald until his death.

A malignant growth was discovered in Buchanan's body sometime in August 1953 and he died on July 12, 1954, ten days after celebrating his 78th birthday.

Buchanan was an ardent supporter of the Waterton Lakes National Park, where a number of features bare his name, including Buchanan Peak (in the Clark Range which was named for the Senator in 1971, and Buchanan Ridge.

References

Citations

Bibliography

External links
 
 

1876 births
1954 deaths
Canadian senators from Alberta
Writers from Lethbridge
People from Peterborough County
Liberal Party of Canada MPs
Unionist Party (Canada) MPs
Liberal Party of Canada senators
Members of the House of Commons of Canada from Alberta
Alberta Liberal Party MLAs
Members of the Executive Council of Alberta
Canadian newspaper editors
Ontario Hockey Association executives
The Canadian Press people